Winds of War may refer to:
 The Winds of War, a novel by Herman Wouk (1971) 
 The Winds of War (miniseries) (1983), based on the book by Herman Wouk
Winds of War (album), a speed metal album by Iron Angel
 Heroes of Might and Magic IV: Winds of War, a 2003 computer video game
"Winds of War" (Mobile Suit Gundam), an episode of Mobile Suit Gundam
"The Winds of War", a song on the album The Psycho-Social, Chemical, Biological & Electro-Magnetic Manipulation of Human Consciousness by hip hop group Jedi Mind Tricks